The Williamstown railway line is a  commuter rail passenger train service in Melbourne, Australia, operating between Williamstown in the western suburbs to Flinders Street in the central business district. It runs across flat coastal land and therefore has no significant earthworks. From the junction at Newport to the next station of North Williamstown, it runs beside the Newport Workshops, and from there through mainly old residential areas. The line used to continue a short distance to Williamstown Pier, around which there is heavy industrial areas including shipbuilding.

Infrastructure 

The Williamstown Line shares tracks with the Werribee line between Flinders Street and Newport. The line is double track throughout, except for Williamstown station, and provided with automatic block signalling. There are no intermediate terminating facilities. Stabling facilities are provided within the grounds of the Newport workshops.

Services
Trains on the Williamstown line stop all stations. In general, trains run every 20 minutes during regular hours. As the Werribee and Williamstown lines merge at Newport towards Flinders Street, frequency is doubled. Regular 10-minute intervals are formed of Williamstown and Laverton (via Altona) services. Shuttle services between Newport and Williamstown occur in the evenings, weekend mornings, and as part of the Night Network. Newport is where passengers change into trains to or from the city. These shuttles are operated as 3 car train-sets. Inbound shuttles terminate on platform 1 at Newport and are stored in a siding on the city side of the station. The siding allow trains to reverse and form outbound Williamstown shuttle services departing from platform 2.

Station List 
Legend – Stations

 ◼ Premium Station – Station staffed from first to last train
 ◻ Host Station – Usually staffed during morning peak, however this can vary for different stations on the network.

Legend – Stopping Patterns

 ● – All trains stop

History and future 

Although it is now operated as a branch from the main Werribee/Geelong line at Newport, the line was originally built from the city, with the Geelong line being the branch.  The line officially opened in January 1859, but the section between the vicinity of the Newport workshops and Williamstown Pier was in use by Geelong-line trains from October 1857 (see the history of the Werribee line for more information).

The line was electrified in August 1920, but little further change to the infrastructure took place until the section from Williamstown to Williamstown Pier closed in March 1987. Automatic Block signalling was provided in August 1997.

With the electrification of the Werribee line in 1983, many of the Williamstown Pier services became shuttle services from Newport instead of through services from Flinders Street.

The January 2021 timetable rewrite resulted in previous weekend daytime shuttle services being extended from Newport to Flinders Street. Peak hour weekday services now stop at South Kensington, which simplifies stopping patterns on the Werribee Line.

The level crossing at Ferguson Street, adjacent to North Williamstown Station, has now been removed by the Level Crossing Removal Authority with the railway sunk into a rail trench and an entirely new station built replacing the previous station on that site. The crossing was fully removed in 2022.

References

External links
Williamstown line timetable
Official line map
Network map
Statistics and detailed schematic map at the VicSig enthusiast website

Railway lines in Melbourne
Railway lines opened in 1859
1859 establishments in Australia
Williamstown, Victoria
Public transport routes in the City of Melbourne (LGA)
Transport in the City of Maribyrnong
Transport in the City of Hobsons Bay
1500 V DC railway electrification